Edling was a title given to the agreed successor or heir apparent of a reigning Welsh monarch. The title comes from the Old English word Æþeling "noble child" (for example, see Edgar the Ætheling), which was used in Anglo-Saxon England before the Norman Conquest to denote one of "royal blood".

The Welsh use had a more precise meaning and denoted the acknowledged heir to the throne, usually the ruler's eldest son, even though any son, legitimate or illegitimate, could be chosen as edling.

See also
Titles of the Welsh Court

References

Noble titles
Welsh monarchs
Welsh royalty
Medieval Wales